"Of Thee I Sing" is a 1931 song composed by George Gershwin, with lyrics by Ira Gershwin.

It was introduced by William Gaxton and Lois Moran in the 1931 Pulitzer Prize winning musical Of Thee I Sing.

Notable recordings 
Ben Selvin & His Orchestra - their recording for Columbia Records was a hit in 1932.
Sarah Vaughan - Sarah Vaughan Sings George Gershwin (EmArcy, 1957)
The Andrews Sisters - for their album Fresh and Fancy Free (1957, Capitol).
Ella Fitzgerald - Ella Fitzgerald Sings the George and Ira Gershwin Songbook (1959)
Johnny Mathis - Broadway (1964)

References

Songs with music by George Gershwin
Songs with lyrics by Ira Gershwin
Songs from musicals
1931 songs